Linda Mitchell is an American artist. Born in Atlanta, Georgia, her works have been exhibited widely, especially in the US. She is known for her mixed-media animal paintings and installations. She has two MFAs from Georgia State University in painting and sculpture. Linda combines painted and sculptural imagery, creating multimedia paintings that are intricate, surreal scenes, reflecting life’s complexity – layered with experience, memory, expectations, hopes, and dreams. Linda Mitchell's works have been exhibited since 1982.

Exhibitions

2021 	Esprits des Animaux, Mason Fine Art.  Atlanta, GA

2020 	Solo Exhibition, Foosaner Art Museum. Melbourne FL.

2019   Truth in Animals, Cultural Arts Council, Douglasville, Georgia

2017	Truth in Animals, Everhart Museum of Natural History, Science and Art, Scranton, PA

2017    Truth in Animals, Southern Alleghenies Museum or Art, Johnstown, PA.

2016	Seamless Stories, Thomas Deans Fine Art, Atlanta, GA .

2015    Lucid Dreamer, Linda Matney Gallery, Williamsburg, VA.

2014	Wild Things, The Museum of Greater Lafayette, Lafayette, IN.	

2011    Memory, Fantasy, Mystery, Spiva Center for the Arts, Joplin, MO.	

2012   Mixed Media Exhibit Inspires Students, Campus Life, 20 September 2012

2014    Rhythms of Still Life Art Show

Artist Profile, Lindia Mitchell

References

Living people
Artists from Atlanta
Painters from Georgia (U.S. state)
21st-century American sculptors
Georgia State University alumni
Year of birth missing (living people)